Prince Hamid Armah (born 6 October 1981) is a member of the New Patriotic Party and the Member of Parliament for Kwesimintsim Constituency in the Western Region of Ghana.

He previously served as the Director General of the National Council for Curriculum and Assessment.

Early life and education 
Dr. Armah was born in Kwesimintsim in the Western Region of Ghana, where he had his basic education before proceeding to St John’s Secondary School in Sekondi. From there, he went to the University of Education, Winneba, where he obtained both his Bachelor’s and Master’s degrees in Mathematics Education.

He later earned a Doctor of Philosophy in Mathematics Education, with specialization in Curriculum, Pedagogy and Education Policy. Also, Armah holds certificates in Quantitative Methods from the Doctoral Training Centres of the University of Edinburgh, the University of Manchester, and the University of Nottingham.

Career 
In January 2019, he was appointed as the Executive Secretary of the National Council for Curriculum and Assessment. Following the passing of the Education Regulatory Bodies Act 2019, he was appointed as the first (acting) Director General of the curriculum body.

Political life 
On June 20, 2020, he defeated then incumbent Member of Parliament, Mr Joe Mensah in the party’s parliamentary primary, polling 222 votes against his opponent’s 167. In December, he defeated two other challengers to retain the Kwesimintsim seat for the New Patriotic Party with 24,759 votes, well ahead of his closest contender, who polled 13,385. He is currently Vice Chairman of the Parliamentary Select Committee on Education and a member of the House Committee.

References

External links 
 https://princeharmah.com/ Official web page

Living people
Ghanaian Muslims
Ghanaian MPs 2021–2025
New Patriotic Party politicians
People from Western Region (Ghana)
University of Education, Winneba alumni
1981 births